Sharda Prasad is an Indian politician and a member of 17th Legislative Assembly of Uttar Pradesh. He represents the Chakia constituency and is a member of the Bharatiya Janata Party.

Political career
Prasad won his seat the 2017 Uttar Pradesh Legislative Assembly elections by defeating Jitendra Kumar of the Bahujan Samaj Party with a margin of 20,063 votes.

Posts held

References

Uttar Pradesh MLAs 2017–2022
Year of birth missing (living people)
Living people
Bharatiya Janata Party politicians from Uttar Pradesh